Gaspare Colosimo (1859–1940) was an Italian jurist and politician who held various government posts, including minister for posts and telegraphs and minister of colonies.

Early life and education

Colosimo was born in Colosimi, Cosenza, on 8 April 1859. His parents were Peter Paul, an attorney, and Artemisia Colosimo. He received a law degree.

Career
Following his graduation Colosimo settled in Naples where he worked as a lawyer. Then he involved in politics and became a councillor and then director of the province. On 6 November 1892 he elected a deputy from the constituency of Serrastretta, province of Catanzaro, and served in the parliament until 1921. Colosimo was the minister for posts and telegraphs from 24 November 1913 to 19 March 1914. Next he was the minister of colonies between 19 June 1916 and 23 June 1919 in the cabinets of Paolo Boselli and then of Vittorio Emanuele Orlando. Colosimo replaced Ferdinando Martini as minister of colonies. When he was in office he developed a program for Italian colonies which focused on East Africa in general and Ethiopia in particular. It was the first official document which clearly articulated the colonial goals of the Italian Empire. Then he served as the deputy prime minister and minister of interior from 9 March to 23 June 1919 in the cabinet led by Vittorio Emanuele Orlando. In 1924 Colosimo was elected as a senator.

Personal life and death
Colosimo was married, and one of his children died young. He died in 1940.

References

External links

19th-century Italian lawyers
20th-century Italian lawyers
1859 births
1940 deaths
Government ministers of Italy
Members of the Senate of the Kingdom of Italy
Italian Ministers of the Interior
People from the Province of Cosenza